The R157 is a Regional road between Dunboyne and Maynooth in Ireland. It connects to the M3 motorway (Blanchardstown to Kells). This route runs in Counties Kildare and Meath.

Route description
The R157 runs form Maynooth in County Kildare through Bogganstown and Dunboyne to the M3 Motorway in County Dublin.

Distance
Westport: 260km
Malin Head: 315km
Mizen Head: 392km

References

 http://www.meath.ie/LocalAuthorities/NewsandEvents/Name,49417,en.html
 https://web.archive.org/web/20090412142441/http://www.m3motorway.ie/ 
 http://www.eurolink-m3.ie 

Roads in County Kildare
Roads in County Meath
Regional roads in the Republic of Ireland